The South African Translators' Institute (SATI) is the largest association in South Africa representing professional, academic and amateur translators and other language practitioners.

SATI was founded in 1956. Membership is open to anyone, and at present there are around 800 members (2012 figure).

The institute has adopted official names in South Africa's other official languages, namely (and ).

Purpose 

SATI's purpose is to promote the interests of the translation profession in South Africa, chiefly through:

 undertaking, promoting and/or publishing research
 publishing a journal and various language and translation guides
 enforcing a code of ethics for translators
 co-operating with other organisations and institutions to promote the profession
 lobbying for proper training facilities for translators
 at some future date, limiting membership to those who had passed an examination

Other developments through which SATI contributes to translation in South Africa, include:

 administering a system of accreditation based on set examinations
 granting bursaries to students of translation each year
 awarding a cash prize for outstanding translation in various fields every three years
 maintaining a database of freelance translators, interpreters and editors, which is accessible to the public
 representing South African interests internationally as a member of the International Federation of Translators (FIT)

Industry recognition 

Recognition for SATI in the translation industry in South Africa is sporadic, and SATI accreditation has no official recognition in South African law. However, some government departments prefer to employ SATI accreditees, e.g., certain metropolitan city councils and the police, and a few government departments even pay their employees' SATI membership fees. SATI's freelance tariffs have been used in some legislation as a yardstick.

Membership 
Membership is open to anyone from any country in any profession, though most members are South Africans who are translators. There are about 800 members.

The only requirement for membership is that new members agree to adhere to SATI's code of ethics and pay an annual membership fee (R845 in 2019). There are no membership examinations, although introduction of such examinations has been an ideal since the founding of the institute.

Code of ethics 

The fifteen tenets of the SATI code of ethics are as follows:

All members of SATI shall:

 aim for best quality of text interpretation, terminology use, spelling and grammar, and tone and register
 accept full responsibility for their translations
 inform their clients of unresolved problems
 accept only work which they are capable of doing (although translators may accept work that they are incapable of doing if their clients have been made aware of the fact)
 deliver their work by the deadline and in the form agreed upon with the client
 constantly pursue self-improvement
 share professional know-how with other members
 treat as confidential all new information about their clients and work done for them
 accept no work that is for unlawful or dishonest purposes
 accept no work that is contrary to public interest
 not charge excessive rates
 respect copyright and author rights
 practise high ethical and moral standards when dealing with clients and colleagues
 participate in the activities of the Institute
 always behave and translate in a manner that advances the interests of the Institute and the profession

Accreditation 

SATI offers an accreditation examination to members and has done so since 1990.  In 2011, some 240 of its 800 members were accredited. Several members were accredited in more than one trade or language, and there were 390 accreditations.

Members of SATI are encouraged to gain accreditation, but it is not required for membership.  Accreditation is, however, required of members of the SATI executive committee and the executive committees of both formal and informal chapters of the institute.  Formal chapters are required to have a certain minimum number of accredited members.  Only accredited members are allowed to vote at SATI's annual general meeting.

Corporate members who adhere to specific requirements set by the Institute may also become accredited.

Types of accreditation 

SATI offers accreditation for general translation, sworn translation, language editing, simultaneous interpreting, and terminology in various combinations of South Africa's 11 official languages and some non-South African languages such as Dutch, French, German, Italian, Portuguese and Spanish.

SATI has an agreement with the National Accreditation Authority for Translators and Interpreters in Australia (NAATI) regarding translation accreditation in other languages that are not as common in South Africa.

The examinations 

Candidates taking the translation, editing and terminology examinations are given 24 hours to complete a number of texts at their own premises. During this 24-hour period they are not allowed to contact other humans. The product of the exam must be entirely their own (no external editors, proofreaders, etc.). To counteract the possibility of cheating, the translators' exams are particularly difficult, and the specific preferences of examiners are not made known to candidates. The exam papers typically include a literary piece, an academic piece, and a choice from certain broad technical fields.

The examination papers are marked independently by two examiners. In cases where one examiner passes and the other fails the candidate, a third examiner is appointed, with the view to a 2/3 ruling.

The interpreter examinations are held once or twice a year at different centres across the country, depending on demand. Interpreter accreditation is also available for South African Sign Language.

Members who fail an examination must wait 12 months before attempting the exam again. A list of current accreditees are available on the institute's web site.

Structure 

The institute is run by an executive comprising a chairperson, vice-chairperson, secretary, registrar and treasurer.

The following committees have also been set up to guide the institute's activities: Accreditation and Ethics.

SATI office-bearers and committee members work on a voluntary basis. Members of the executive are elected at an annual general meeting for a period of three years.

Members of SATI may establish regional and subject-specific chapters. There are a number of chapters: Western Cape, Eastern Cape, KZN, Free State & Northern Cape, Northwest and Emerging Practitioners.

Publications 

Publications produced by the Institute are the Sworn Translation manual (guide to the practice of sworn translation in South Africa), and Bridging Language Barriers: SATI – The First Fifty Years (a history of the institute).

Coat of arms 

In 1979 MAY, SATI applied for and registered a coat of arms at the South African State Herald.

References

External links 
 South African Translators' Institute

South African Translators' Institute
South African Translators' Institute
 
1956 establishments in South Africa